Canals is a municipality (pop., INE 2007: 13,771) in the comarca of Costera in the Valencian Community, Spain.

It shares borders with the municipalities of  l'Alcúdia de Crespins, Cerdà, la Granja de la Costera, Xàtiva, Llanera de Ranes, Montesa, Torrella and Vallés (in the same comarca) and with Aielo de Malferit and l'Olleria (comarca of Vall d'Albaida).

Geography 
Canals is located in the valley of Montesa, between the Grossa mountains and la Costera. The highest points are in la Serra Grossa, where we can find the peaks of l'Atalaia (556 m) and la Creu (520 m), on the municipal boundary with l'Olleria. The Cànyoles River crosses the town in the west-northeast direction; the Sants River begins its course close to town, where it divides into two channels (séquies) that bring water to Xàtiva and the fields of Canals.

The village lies on the left bank of the Cànyoles river. Canals and l'Alcúdia de Crespins together form a conurbation.

From València you can reach Canals taking the A-7 highway.

Towns of the municipality 
 Canals
 Aiacor
 Torre d'En Cerdà, or Torre dels Frares.

History 
Some evidence of Roman civilization has been found. During the year of Muslim occupation it was a very important "alqueria" owned by Xàtiva.

Then in the Christian era, in 1244, king James I of Aragon gave Dionís of Hungary the tower and the small village of Canals and created the new lordship of the Señorío de Torre de Canals. Dionis of Hungary gave the king the castle in the valley of Veo and also the castle of Ain and other territories. The Christian resettlement was made by Catalans. On July 30, Peter IV "el Cerimoniós" gave the place to Raimon de Riusech taking it from Joan Eximenis d'Urrea, with the condition that if he had no male descendants it would be given back to the crown, but in the end it was sold to Xàtiva, with the king's approval on February 19 of 1353 as a barony. During the rule by Xàtiva there were continuous tributary conflicts. In the year 1506 Xàtiva bought La Torreta.

In 1522 during the Revolt of the Brotherhoods, Canals was used by the viceroy as his headquarters to attack Xàtiva, where the 'Encobert' was hidden. Many prisoners were taken from Xàtiva to Canals. In 1639 Phillip IV, paid Xàtiva 20.000 pounds, and gave independence to Canals as a village (vila). In the 19th century Canals developed industry, with 24 glass factories, a paper factory, metal workshops, flour mills, and cloth sellers. In the 20th century this industrial activity increased with oil, furniture, construction materials, leather and cloth production.

Demography

Main sights 
 Tower and walls of the Borgias
 Oratory of the Borgias
 Route of the Borgias

People from Canals

 Alfons de Borja, Pope Callixtus III

Economy 
The economy is divided into agriculture (oranges), industry famous for its clothing and leather production (Ferry's, Rodrigo Sancho S.A.), and marble.
Today the industry is almost dead with the main companies having closed down: Ferry's (2007), Argent (2008), Rodrigo Sancho S.A. (2010), and many others.

Pottery has also been very important, and has given the people from Canals the nickname of "perolers" (potters).

References

External links 
 Canals Actualitat La web lider en noticies i opinions de Canals.
 Ajuntament de Canals
 Assemblea de Joves de Canals
 Enllaç a Canals en el google maps
 Conèixer Canals, Web per a conèixer la població de la Costera, Canals
 La Costera Digital, Periòdic independent de la Costera, Canals.
 Institut Valencià d'Estadística
 Portal de la Direcció General d'Administració Local de la Generalitat
 AI MARE!, Web de fotos i videos d'humor feta a Canals
 4Q-QUARTET - Quartet de trombons
 Associació Musical Canalense

Municipalities in the Province of Valencia
Costera
Route of the Borgias